Abbess End is a hamlet in the Epping Forest district, close to the southern end of Abbess Roding, and north of the former site of the moated country house Rookwood Hall, in the county of Essex, England.

References

External links

Epping Forest District
Hamlets in Essex